Produce Buying Company is a Ghanaian cocoa bean company.
They are listed on the stock index of the Ghana Stock Exchange, the GSE All-Share Index. It formed on November 13, 1981.

Operations
Produce Buying Company is one of the biggest dealers in cocoa, sheanut and other cash crop in the West Africa sub-region.

Produce Buying Company purchases high quality cocoa beans/sheanuts from farmers and prepares, stores them in purpose-built sheds at village/society level and ensures prompt delivery of the graded and sealed stocks to designated Take Over Centers collection points in the most efficient and profitable manner for inspection, grading and sealing by the Ghana Cocoa Board's Quality Control Department.

References

External links
Produce Buying Company official homepage
Produce Buying Company - Annual Report 2010 
GhanaWeb.com
Produce Buying Company at Alacrastore

Food and drink companies of Ghana
Companies based in Accra
Food and drink companies established in 1981
Companies listed on the Ghana Stock Exchange
1981 establishments in Ghana